Kassas is a surname. Notable people with the surname include:

Ibrahim Kassas, Tunisian politician
Mohamed Kassas (1921–2012), Egyptian botanist and conservationist
Mohammad Kassas (born 1976), Lebanese footballer

See also
Kassa (name)